Maria Antonia, Princess of Bavaria, Electress of Saxony (18 July 1724 – 23 April 1780) was a German princess, composer, singer, harpsichordist and patron of the arts, known particularly for her operas: Il trionfo della fedeltà (“The triumph of fidelity”) and Talestri, regina delle amazoni (“Talestri, queen of the Amazons”). She was Electress of Saxony as the wife of Frederick Christian, Elector of Saxony. Following the latter's death in 1763, she became the Regent of Saxony for their son Frederick Augustus I of Saxony.

Family and background

Baptized Maria Antoina Walpurgis Symphorosa, she was born at Nymphenburg Palace in Munich to Archduchess Maria Amalia of Austria and Elector Karl Albert of Bavaria. Throughout her life she received an outstanding education, particularly in the arts; including that of painting and writing poetry, as well as music.

She was the fourth of seven children of the Elector and his wife.

Marriage

A marriage by proxy took place in Munich on 13 June 1747 to Frederick Christian, the heir to the Electorate of Saxony, while they would wed in person in Dresden on 20 June 1747. That same year she became a member of the Accademia dell’Arcadia of Rome, a significant institution in operatic reform. With her marriage, she moved to Dresden. She had nine children with Friedrich Christian, seven of whom survived infancy.

Regency

She left Dresden during the Seven Years' War and took refuge in Prague and Munich, but returned at her husband’s accession to the throne in 1763. He died ten weeks later, and their son Frederick Augustus succeeded him. Her son being a minor, she served as joint regent with her brother-in-law Franz Xavier until her son reached legal majority in 1768. During her regency, she opposed her co-regent's act to give up her son's claim on the Polish throne in 1765. She also founded a textile factory in 1763 and a brewery in 1766.

Musical training and composition

While in Munich, Maria Antonia studied music with renowned opera composers Giovanni Battista Ferrandini and Giovanni Porta. After moving to Dresden she continued her studies with Giovanni Alberto Ristori, Nicola Porpora and Johann Adolph Hasse. Indeed, opera played a major part throughout Maria Antonia’s life. The court of Munich celebrated her birth with a performance of the opera Amadis de Grecia by Pietro Torri. Her betrothal to Friedrich Christian was likewise celebrated with opera performances, including Hasse’s La Spartana generosa, sets by Bibiena, and Gluck’s opera Le nozze d’Ercole e d’Ebe. Shortly after moving to Dresden, she penned the libretto for Hasse’s oratorio, La conversione di Sant’Agostino (1750), in addition to her composing work. Her own compositional style shows a strong affinity for that of Hasse, especially his conception of opera seria. She also performed actively as a singer and keyboard player in court performances, including leading roles in both of her operas. In addition to her two operas, a number of arias, a pastorale, intermezzos, meditations and motets are attributed to her.

Talestri
The Amazon queen Thalestris appears in numerous works from Greek mythology, and, like many stories and mythic sequences, it became a frequent subject for works throughout the late Middle Ages and beyond. The French poet Gautier de Coste LaCalprenède revived the tale in the novel Cassandre (1644–1650), though the story was altered from the semi-historical account involving Alexander the Great to one involving Orontes, Prince of the Massagetes, as the male foil to Talestris.

Several operas took on the same principle over the next century, with Maria Antonia crafting her own libretto and music. The plot centers on Talestris’ relationship with a Scythian ruler Orontes, as in LaCalprenède’s version. In addition to the title character, two other prominent characters are women: Antiope, her advisor who also falls in love with a Scythian man, Learchus; and Tomiris, the high priestess of Diana, who is—as revealed near the end of the opera—the mother of Orontes. Ultimately, the plot ends happily, with each couple united and war averted, as the Scythians and Amazons manage to peacefully co-exist. The depiction of the benevolent, thoughtful ruler Talestris coming to be a political leader suggests the possibility that the opera is a semi-autobiographical rendering of Maria Antonia herself.

Critical reception
Though published using the pseudonym ETPA, standing for Ermelinda Talea Pastorella Arcadia, Maria Antonia’s operas were successfully published by Breitkopf and enjoyed warm reviews both in their premieres at the court theater, which she sang in, and also throughout other European cities. Music critic Charles Burney praised her opera and her singing in his 1773 work, The Present State of Music in Germany, the Netherlands and United Provinces. Also of note, the philosopher and music theorist Antonio Eximeno y Pujades included an aria from Talestri in his 1774 treatise Dell’ origine e delle regole della musica, putting her in the company of five other selected composers: Palestrina, Nanini, Clari, Pergolesi, and Corelli. 

Although her music is treated somewhat more broadly with less musical analysis, the entire treatise is used to model compositional techniques, implying a high regard for her work by Antonio Eximeno y Pujades, and presumably other contemporaries.

Works
Il trionfo della fedeltà: opera, libretto by Maria Antonia (Dresden, summer 1754)
Talestri, regina delle amazoni: opera, libretto by Maria Antonia (Nymphenburg, 6 February 1760)

Discography
 Talestri, regina delle amazoni: Dramma per musica. CD, Berlin: Folkert Uhde, 1999 and 2003

Ancestry

References

Citations

Sources
 Allroggen, Gerhard: Maria Antonia Walpurgis, Electress of Saxony. Grove Music Online. Ed. L. Macy. Accessed January 30, 2007. 
 Burney, Charles: The Present State of Music in Germany, the Netherlands, and the United Provinces. London, 1773.
 López, Pilar Ramos: Maria Antonia Walpurgis: Baroque Composer. Accessed January 30, 2007.
 Seiferling, Steffen: Talestri, Regina delle Amazzoni. (Liner notes of CD, see discography).
 Walpurgis, Maria Antonia: Talestri, regina delle Amazzoni: drama per music, de E.T.P.A. Leipzig: G. G. I. Breitkopf, 1765.
 Antonio Eximeno y Pujades: Dell' origine e delle regole della musica, colla storia del suo progresso, decadenza, e rinnovazione. Rome, 1774.
 Heinrich Theodor Flathe: Maria Antonia von Bayern. In: Allgemeine Deutsche Biographie (ADB). Band 20, Duncker & Humblot, Leipzig 1884, S. 371–374.

|-

1724 births
1780 deaths
18th-century viceregal rulers
18th-century women rulers
18th-century classical composers
18th-century keyboardists
18th-century German women opera singers
18th-century German composers
18th-century women composers
Duchesses of Bavaria
German opera composers
House of Wittelsbach
Nobility from Munich
German opera librettists
Electoral Princesses of Saxony
Burials at Dresden Cathedral
German harpsichordists
Electresses of Saxony
Regents of Saxony
German women classical composers
Women opera composers
Women classical composers
⚭Duchess Maria Antonia of Bavaria
Daughters of emperors
Children of Charles VII, Holy Roman Emperor
Daughters of kings